Teegarden is an Americanized version of the surname Theegarten. Notable people with the surname include:

Aimee Teegarden (born 1989), American actress, model, and producer
Bonnard J. Teegarden, American astrophysicist credited with discovering Teegarden's Star
David Teegarden, American rock drummer

See also
 Teagarden

References

Americanized surnames